Dudh Sagar railway station (Station code: DDS) is a small railway station in South Goa district, Goa. It serves Dudh Sagar village. The station consists of one platform. The platform is not well sheltered. It lacks many facilities, including water and sanitation. This station is one of three in the Braganza Ghats.

References

Hubli railway division
Railway stations in South Goa district